Adam Willett (born April 4, 1982) is an American boxer best known to represent his country at the 2005 world championships at 201 lbs.  He currently freelances as a trainer/coach and security guard. He has returned to the ring March 2011 after having been critically shot in April 2010.

Amateur career
Southpaw counterpuncher Adam 'Showtime' Willett originated from Bellport NY started boxing in 2001 and immediately won the NY Golden Gloves in 2002 178 lb. Novice. In 2004 he became Empire State Games, State Champion-201 lb. Open.

In 2005 he added to the prestigious National PAL Police Athletic League Championships beating Eric Fields and a second time with the Empire State Games, State Champion-201 lb. Open. Willett was on the "Elite" US World Team Heavyweight-201 lb.as well as the A.I.B.A. World Championships-China. He was Ranked #1 Heavyweight in the U.S.Top-Ten Ranked Heavyweights in the World and represented the United States in the 2005 World Championships where he dec. Rosberg Jarno Antero, FIN, 24-8, in the first round but lost on disqualification to Subacius Vitalijus, LTU, DQ-4, in the second round.

He became National Amateur Heavyweight Champions|US champion in 2006 as well as United States Heavyweight Champion #1 Ranked Heavyweight in the U.S., New York Golden Gloves Champion-201 lb.
"Blue and Gold" National 201 lb. Champion, Two-time P.A.L. National Champion 201 lb., "World Cup Championships" US-201 lb., and Three-time National Heavyweight Champion- 201 lb..

In 2007 Willett took 2nd place in the New York Golden Gloves Championships and was favored to win the US Championships but failed his medical before the bout against Deontay Wilder. Fought in the Olympic Trial taking 3rd place. He was the US team member at the PanAm Games 2007.

First 2008 Olympic Qualifier

Professional career
Willett turned pro in 2009 and won his first bout but surprisingly lost in his second bout against unheralded Garrett Wilson. Garrett Wilson has gone on to a very successful career as a Cruiserweight. Willett is now 2-1 after his bout with Sharieff Hayes in March 2011.

Shooting
On April 7, 2010, Adam was critically injured during a shooting that is believed to be a botched robbery attempt. He was in the Miracle Plaza Shopping Center in Long Island, NY when he was shot in the abdomen.

External links
Bio
Article
Record

References

1982 births
Living people

Boxers from New York (state)
Heavyweight boxers
Winners of the United States Championship for amateur boxers
American male boxers